William Talataina (born 5 August 1995) is a Samoan rugby union player, currently playing for the Old Glory DC of Major League Rugby (MLR). His preferred position is centre.

Professional career
Talataina signed for Major League Rugby side Old Glory DC for the 2022 Major League Rugby season.

References

External links
itsrugby.co.uk Profile

1995 births
Living people
Rugby union centres
Samoan rugby union players
Southland rugby union players
Auckland rugby union players
Old Glory DC players